Chauncey Abbott (September 16, 1815 –  January 30, 1872) was an American lawyer and politician. He served as the 5th Village President of Madison, Wisconsin, and represented central Dane County in the Wisconsin State Assembly during the 3rd Wisconsin Legislature.

Early life
Abbott was born in Cornwall, Vermont. He graduated from Middlebury College in Vermont. He came to the Wisconsin Territory in 1841, he read law and began practicing in Fort Winnebago, before moving to Mineral Point. There he became a law partner with Moses M. Strong. He then settled in Madison, where he formed a law practice with John Catlin, future secretary and acting-governor of the Wisconsin Territory.

Political career
In 1848, Abbott ran as the Whig candidate for Secretary of State of Wisconsin, but lost the election. In 1850, he was the District Attorney of Dane County and served in the Wisconsin State Assembly. In the fall of 1852, he was the Whig Party's candidate for United States Congress in Wisconsin's 2nd congressional district, but was defeated.  He was the president of the Dane County Bar Association in 1858.

He was the Postmaster of Madison from 1850-1853, and President of Madison (now Mayor) from 1852-1853. From 1853-1856, he served as a regent for the University of Wisconsin–Madison.

In 1867, he moved back to Vermont. He later moved to Schuyler, Nebraska, and died in Nebraska on January 30, 1872. He is interred in Forest Hill Cemetery in Madison.

Personal life
Abbott married Jane Strong, Moses M. Strong's sister. They had a son and daughter together, but Jane died in 1852 after only seven years of marriage.  Chauncey married for a second time, to Anne Damon Maxwell, the widow of Nathan Perkins Wells.  Together they had four children, though only one, Chauncy II, survived to adulthood.  After Abbott's death, his wife, Anne married again, to Morris E. Fuller

References

Members of the Wisconsin State Assembly
Mayors of Madison, Wisconsin
Lawyers from Madison, Wisconsin
Middlebury College alumni
People from Mineral Point, Wisconsin
Wisconsin postmasters
Wisconsin lawyers
1815 births
1872 deaths
19th-century American politicians
People from Schuyler, Nebraska
19th-century American lawyers